Arnaud Di Pasquale was the defending champion, but did not compete this year.

David Nalbandian won the title by defeating Roger Federer 6–3, 7–5 in the final.

Seeds

Draw

Finals

Top half

Section 1

Section 2

Bottom half

Section 3

Section 4

References
 ITF tournament profile
 Unofficial results archive (since Quarterfinals)

Boys' Singles
1998